Madrasah Aljunied Al-Islamiah is a full-time, private Islamic institution of learning in Singapore, one of the six such madrasahs in Singapore. Madrasah Aljunied is one of the oldest surviving madrasahs in Singapore. Through its years, it has gained eminence for its high standard of Arabic language and Islamic scholarship in the region. Madrasah Aljunied boasts an illustrious line of alumni of prominent Islamic religious leaders in Singapore and Southeast Asia.

Vision, Mission & Core Values 

Vision: Nurturing Global Islamic Scholars and Leaders

Mission: (i) To produce Taqwa scholars who will lead the local and global communities (ii) To provide students with a balanced, holistic and dynamic educational experience (iii) To empower students with knowledge, skills and values that are purposeful and relevant.

Core Values: (i) Itqan - Efficient (ii) Ihsan - Compassionate (iii) Ikhlas - Sincere

Leadership 
Principal : Mdm Khairiana Zainal Abiden

Vice Principal : Ustazah Harinah Abdul Latiff

Assistant Vice Principal : Ustaz Abdul Mukhsien Mohd Shariff

IBDP Coordinator: Mdm Khalidah Abdullah

History 

Madrasah Aljunied is located next to the historical Jalan Kubor Cemetery.

Madrasah Aljunied is the second oldest Islamic school in Singapore after Madrasah Alsagoff. It was founded in 1927 by a philanthropist, Syed Abdul Rahman Aljunied. The school's original two-storey building stood on a  plot of land. The new building, however, sits on a mere 0.52 hectare of land.

Madrasah Aljunied's founder, Syed Abdul Rahman Aljunied, observed that Abu Bakar bin Taha was the most eligible candidate for the position of Headmaster. Abu Bakar agreed but on two conditions: that the Arabic language be used as the medium of instruction; and that its educational system and pedagogy must be modern.

Abu Bakar's conditions were well-received, and he ran the Madrasah with tight discipline as Headmaster from 1927 to 1955.

Through the years, Madrasah Aljunied's reputation as a premier Islamic educational institution in South East Asia was solidified. An apocryphal account states that Abu Bakar even allowed a section of his house at Java Road to be used as free accommodation for his students.

Curriculum 

The school employs a dual-curriculum system that balances both religious and non-religious subjects. The school's objective means that emphasis is given to Islamic subjects.

For Islamic subjects, the school uses a variant of Al-Azhar curriculum, which also ensures accreditation and direct entry to the University of Al-Azhar.

Secular subjects are largely taught as part of the local curriculum and gain MOE-recognised qualifications. Students are either in the four-year "Express" stream and take the "O" Levels at Secondary 4 or in the five-year "Normal" (Academic) stream and take the "O" Levels as well.

The school is also an IB World School and offers the IB Diploma Program for its students.

Notable alumni 
 Ustaz Dr. Nazirudin Mohd Nasir, current Mufti of Singapore
 Ustaz Dr. Fatris Bakaram, former Mufti of Singapore
 Sheikh Syed Isa Mohamed Semait, former Mufti of Singapore.
 Ustaz Salim Jasman, former President of the Syariah Court.
 Ustaz Abu Bakar Hashim, former President of the Syariah Court, and a key actor in negotiations with terrorists during the Laju incident in 1974.
 Ustaz Syed Ahmad Syed Mohamed and Ustaz Pasuni Maulan, Registrars of Muslim Marriages.
 Ustaz Ahmad Sonhaji, a prominent religious leader
 Ustaz Syed Abdillah Aljufri, a prominent religious leader
 Pehin Dato Seri Utama Dr Haji Mohamad Zain Haji Serudin, Brunei's Minister of Religious Affairs, and first Bruneian to graduate from the prestigious Al-Azhar University in 1963.
 Dr. Ahmad Abdurrahman, one of the two madrasah students who were offered places in the highly competitive Yong Loo Lin School of Medicine in National University of Singapore for the first time in 2015. The other is Amalina Ridzuan, a graduate of Madrasah Al-Ma'arif Al-Islamiah.
 Ustaz Irwan Hadi Bin Mohd Shuhaimy, Deputy Director of Office of the Mufti Singapore

References 

Madrasahs in Singapore
Secondary schools in Singapore
Independent schools in Singapore